Statistics of Swiss Super League in the 1899–1900 season.

East

West

Final

|colspan="3" style="background-color:#D0D0D0" align=center|18 March 1900

|}

Grasshopper Club Zürich won the championship.

Sources 
 Switzerland 1899-1900 at RSSSF

Seasons in Swiss football
Swiss Football League seasons
1899–1900 in Swiss football
Swiss